The 2012 Nova Scotia Men's Molson Provincial Championship was held from February 8 to 12 at the Bridgewater Curling Club in Bridgewater, Nova Scotia. The winning team, skipped by Jamie Murphy, represented Nova Scotia at the 2012 Tim Hortons Brier in Saskatoon, Saskatchewan.

Teams

Standings

Results

Draw 1
February 8, 9:00 AM

Draw 2
February 8, 2:00 PM

Draw 3
February 9, 9:00 AM

Draw 4
February 9, 2:00 PM ,

Draw 5
February 9,  7:00 PM

Draw 6
February 10,  2:00 PM

Draw 7
February 10, 7:00 PM

Playoffs

1 vs. 2
February 11, 2:00 PM

3 vs. 4
February 11, 2:00 PM

Semifinal
February 11, 7:00 PM

Final
February 12, 2:00 PM

References

Nova Scotia Men's Molson Provincial Championship
Nova Scotia Men's Molson Provincial Championship
Men's Molson Provincial Championship
Nova Scotia Men's Molson Provincial Championship
Bridgewater, Nova Scotia
Curling competitions in Nova Scotia